Eric Shansby (born 1985) commonly known as Shansby, is an American cartoonist and children's book illustrator. His cartoons appear in American news outlets, most prominently in The Washington Post alongside columns by humorist Gene Weingarten.

Early life 
Shansby grew up in Silver Spring, Maryland. His mother was a librarian. He was interested in art from a young age and would trace the images in the library books his mother brought home to him. He drew caricatures of his classmates and teachers in elementary school.

Shansby published his first comic strip his sophomore year of Montgomery Blair High School. He was the art editor and a cartoonist for his high school newspaper. He created both editorial cartoons and a strip OxyMoron. There, he met Washington Post writer Gene Weingarten when Weingarten gave a guest lecture in Shansby's journalism class. When Weingarten first saw Shansby's work, he noted it was "breathtaking stuff."

For his work in high school, Shansby won The Freedom Forum's Free Spirit Scholarship and the Maryland Scholastic Press and Quill & Scroll Society/National Newspaper Association's editorial cartoon awards. At the 2002 Columbia Scholastic Press Association's Gold Circle Awards, he placed first in art/illustration portfolio, comic cartoons, editorial cartoons, and sports cartoons. In addition, he came in second place for his cartoon portfolio and third place for editorial cartoons. He graduated from high school in 2003.

Shansby studied philosophy at Yale University, graduating in 2007. There, he was a member of St. Anthony Hall and was also a political cartoonist for the Yale Daily News.

Career 
While in high school, Shansby drew editorial cartoons for the weekly Montgomery County Sentinel. His political cartoons covered AIDS, environmental issues, gay marriage, human cloning, public education, and the Iraq War. Once in collage, he continued submitting to the Sentinel. His work was also published in Young D.C. and The Report Press Law Magazine.

In 2004, Gene Weingarten asked him to illustrate Below the Beltway, his weekly humor column in The Washington Post Magazine. Shansby began contributing to Below the Beltway while he was a freshman in college. He also had a regular feature on the KidsPost website.

Shansby illustrated the 2014 children's book Me & Dog, a parable on atheism written by Weingarten.

In September 2018, Shansby left Below the Beltway as part of the redesign of The Washington Post Magazine. Wiengarten stopped writing the column in 2021.

Personal life 
On the Kojo Nnamdi Show, Shansby identified himself as a “culturally Jewish, American atheist.”

Publications

Books 
 Me & Dog. Simon & Schuster, Simon & Schuster, 2014. Written by Gene Weingarten and illustrated by Eric Shansby.

As Contributing Artist 
 Compleating Cul de Sac. Thompson, Richard, et al. Team Cul de Sac and ComicsDC, 2015.
 Failure by Design: The Story Behind America’s Broken Economy. Bivens, Josh. Cornell University Press, 2011. 
 World Politics in a New Era, 4th Edition. Spiegel, Steven L., et al. Oxford University Press, 2008. 
 Best Editorial Cartoons of the Year 2007. Brooks, Charles (Ed.). Pelican Publishing, 2007. 
 Best Editorial Cartoons of the Year 2006. Brooks, Charles (Ed.). Pelican Publishing, 2006. 
 Best Editorial Cartoons of the Year 2005. Brooks, Charles (Ed.). Pelican Publishing, 2005. 
 Best Editorial Cartoons of the Year 2004. Brooks, Charles (Ed.). Pelican Publishing, 2004.

References

1985 births
Living people
People from Silver Spring, Maryland
Yale University alumni
St. Anthony Hall
American cartoonists
American editorial cartoonists
American children's book illustrators
American people of Jewish descent